Sir John Parnell, 1st Baronet (c. 1720–1782), was an Irish politician and a baronet.

Biography
He was the only son of John Parnell (1680–1727), Esq., MP and later Judge of the Court of King's Bench (Ireland), and Mary, sister of the Lord Chief-Justice William Whitshed. His uncle, the Rev. Thomas Parnell was the archdeacon of Clogher in 1705, prebendary of Dublin in 1713, vicar of Finglas in 1718, and poet, friend of Alexander Pope and Jonathan Swift.

He was appointed High Sheriff of Queen's County in 1753. He was a Member of Parliament (MP) for Maryborough in 1761, and was created a Baronet of Rathleague, Queen's County, on 3 November 1766. Sir John married Anne, second daughter of Michael Ward, of Castle Ward, County Down, one of the judges of the court of King's Bench in Ireland and Anna Catherine Hamilton, daughter of James Hamilton of Bangor, County Down. Anne was the sister of  Bernard Ward,  1st Viscount Bangor.

Sir John Parnell died in 1782, and was succeeded by his only son, Sir John Parnell, 2nd Baronet, knight of the shire for the Queen's County, commissioner of the revenue in Ireland, Chancellor of the Exchequer, Privy Councilor, and Lord of the Treasury He was great-great-grandfather of Irish nationalist leader Charles Stewart Parnell.

See also

Baron Congleton

Notes

Bibliography

Year of birth uncertain
1782 deaths
Baronets in the Baronetage of Ireland
Members of the Parliament of Ireland (pre-1801) for Queen's County constituencies
Irish MPs 1761–1768
High Sheriffs of Queen's County
1720s births